The karate events at the 2005 World Games in Duisburg was played between 23 and 24 July. The karate competition took place at Kfraftzentrale.

Medal table

Events

Men's events

Women's events

References

External links
 World Karate Federation
 Karate on IWGA website
 Results
 World Games 2005 at Karate Records

Karate at the 2005 World Games
2005 World Games
2005
2005 in karate